An  bronze statue of Bobby Orr is installed outside Boston's TD Garden, in the U.S. state of Massachusetts. The sculpture was designed by Harry Weber, and unveiled on May 10, 2010.

See also

 1970 Stanley Cup Finals

References

2010 establishments in Massachusetts
2010 sculptures
Bronze sculptures in Massachusetts
Monuments and memorials in Boston
Outdoor sculptures in Boston
Sculptures of men in Massachusetts
Sculptures of sports
Statues in Boston